George Foster Emmons (August 23, 1811 – July 23, 1884) was a rear admiral of the United States Navy, who served in the early to mid 19th century.

Biography
He was born  in Clarendon, Vermont on August 23, 1811. Emmons began his distinguished career as a midshipman on April 1, 1828.

As a lieutenant aboard the  he participated in the Wilkes Exploring Expedition of 1838 to 1842, which discovered the Antarctic Continent, and throughout the South Seas.

He was assigned command of the expedition's overland party conducting surveys and exploration from Puget Sound south to San Francisco. He served with great honor in the Mexican and Civil Wars. He became commodore in 1868, chief of the Hydrographic Office in 1870, and rear admiral in 1872. As a Rear Admiral, he commanded the Philadelphia Navy Yard until his retirement in 1873. Rear Admiral Emmons died in Princeton, New Jersey on July 23, 1884 at the age of 82. He is buried in Green Mount Cemetery, Baltimore, Maryland.

Namesake

External links
 George Foster Emmons Papers. Yale Collection of Western Americana, Beinecke Rare Book and Manuscript Library, Yale University.

References

1811 births
1884 deaths
People from Clarendon, Vermont
People of the United States Exploring Expedition
People of Vermont in the American Civil War
United States Navy rear admirals (upper half)